Peter was a Bulgarian nobleman who held the high title of sevastokrator around 1253. He married a daughter of Ivan Asen II of Bulgaria. He ruled significant territories in Bulgaria during the reign of his brother-in-law, Michael II Asen.

References

Sources 

 
 
 

Bulgarian nobility
13th-century Bulgarian people
Sebastokrators